Martha Rose Shulman is an American cookbook author, cooking teacher and food columnist for The New York Times. Her father was author Max Shulman.

Biography
Shulman has been writing healthy eating cookbooks for over 30 years since the 1970s. She pulls most of her recipes from Mediterranean and Mexican style dishes using lower-fat versions without losing flavor. Shulman tries to always use fresh, seasonal, and organic ingredients.

Shulman resides in Los Angeles, California.

Bibliography
She has written a number of vegetarian cookbooks which include:
The Vegetarian Feast
Fast Vegetarian Feasts
The Best Vegetarian Recipes
Mediterranean Harvest 
Mediterranean Light
Mexican Light
Provencal Light
Entertaining Light

References

External links
Martha Rose Shulman
Papers of Martha Rose Shulman, 1966-2010: A Finding Aid. * Schlesinger Library, Radcliffe Institute, Harvard University.

American chefs
American food writers
American cookbook writers
Living people
Women cookbook writers
The New York Times columnists
American people of Belarusian-Jewish descent
American women columnists
Jewish American writers
20th-century American non-fiction writers
20th-century American women writers
21st-century American non-fiction writers
21st-century American women writers
Year of birth missing (living people)
James Beard Foundation Award winners
21st-century American Jews
Vegetarian cookbook writers